Prince Aschwin of Lippe-Biesterfeld (13 June 1914 – 14 May 1988) was an expert in Chinese painting and Indian sculpture and curator at the Metropolitan Museum of Art in New York. He was the younger brother of Prince Bernhard of Lippe-Biesterfeld.

Life and career
Aschwin was the second and last child of Prince Bernhard of Lippe and Baroness Armgard of Sierstorpff-Cramm. He was born with the title of count of Biesterfeld and grew up with his elder brother Bernhard at their parents' estate, Castle Reckenwalde (now Wojnowo, Lubusz Voivodeship, Poland). When Adolf Hitler came to power, Aschwin openly supported the Nazis and become a Wehrmacht officer. During the war, Aschwin continued his education in East Asian art. In November 1942, he defended a PhD at the Humboldt University of Berlin on the 13th century Chinese painting Bamboos and Rock by Li Kan, and then worked at the Department of Chinese paintings of the Museum of East Asian Art in Cologne.

In 1945, he left Germany, and in 1949 settled in New York as a research assistant at the Department of Far East of the Metropolitan Museum of Art, where he worked until retirement in 1973. During those years, he regularly published journal articles on Chinese paintings and Buddhist sculptures from South and Southeast Asia.

On 11 September 1951, Prince Aschwin married Simone Arnoux (1915-2001) in London. Arnoux was French and was previously married to German aristocrat Gottfried Adam Vollrat von Watzdorf. She had two children with von Watzdorf, but none with Prince Aschwin. After the birth of Prince Constantijn of the Netherlands on 11 October 1969, Prince Aschwin became one of his godfathers.

Although Bernhard cut off communications with Nazi supporters, including his brother, their relationships resumed after the war. In the 1970s, Bernhard persuaded Aschwin, who was suffering from Parkinson's disease, to return to the Netherlands, where he died in 1988, aged 73.

Main publications

Aschwin Lippe (1970). The Freer Indian Sculptures.  Smithsonian Institution.

References

External links

Publications by Prince Aschwin on Google Books , 
Aschwin Lippe Collection from The Freer Gallery of Art and Arthur M. Sackler Gallery Archives

1914 births
1988 deaths
House of Lippe
Aschwin